The valley of Agror is located in the Hazara region of the Khyber-Pakhtunkhwa province of northern Pakistan. Its territory makes up Oghi Tehsil, an administrative unit of Mansehra District.

Environment 
The lower portions of the Agror valley are heavily cultivated and contain many villages and hamlets. The valley area has few strictly level spaces, but consist of terraced flats, water is abundant year round.

Population 
The main tribe are Swatis, Tanolis, Gujars, Azizwani, Akhoon Khels, and Awan

History 
Agror is the ancient Atyugrapura of the Rajatarangini and the 'Ιθάγονρος town in Ούαρσα mentioned by Ptolemy. From the time of Timur until the beginning of the eighteenth century the Agror valley was held by a family of Karlugh Turks. These were expelled in 1703 by a Saiyid named Jalal Baba, (who happened to be a son-in-Law of last Turk ruler of Hazara, Sultan Mehmud Khurd) with his bigoted Swati lashker and the conquered country was divided among the Swatis,  Agror valley was divided between two Swati groups, one half to the Swati khans of Shamdhara and one half to an upstart Mullah from the tribe, Akhund Sad-ud-din, who died in 1783, rising to the position of self-proclaimed Khan of Agror, by dint of his cunning machinations.

Painda Khan, a renowned chief of the Tanoli tribe took over the valley in 1834, but in 1841 it was restored by the Sikhs to Ata Muhammad, a descendant of the Mullah or Akhund Sad-ud-din. At annexation in 1849 Ata Muhammad was recognized as chief of Agror; but the arrangement did not work satisfactorily as Ata Muhammad khan conflicted with the British demands British. An expedition had to be sent in 1852 to avenge the murder of two officers of the Salt department; and in consequence of the unsatisfactory attitude of the chief and of repeated complaints by the cultivators, it was resolved in 1868 to place a police station in Agror and to bring the valley more directly under the administration of Government. This incensed the Khan of Agror, at whose instigation the newly built police station was burnt by a raid of The Black Mountain (Tor Ghar) Tribes,   Akazais, Hassanzais, Chagharzais etc.

An expedition was dispatched, and Ata Muhammad Khan was deported to Lahore for a time, but in 1870 reinstated in his chieftainship after making slavish representations to the British government. His son and successor, Ali Gauhar, was removed from the valley in 1888 in consequence of his instigating and abetting raids into British territory, and in 1888 as per the orders of government, the Agror jagir was suspended pending a final decision. In order to maintain the peace of the border, expeditions were dispatched against the Black Mountain tribes in 1888, 1891, and 1892. The Agror Valley Regulation (1891) later formally declared the rights of the Khan of Agror to be forfeit to Government.

The land reforms of the valley was assessed by the Sikhs at Rs. 1,515. This demand was continued on annexation and raised to Rs. 3,315 in 1853 and Rs. 4,000 at the regular settlement, in which the engagement was made with the Khan. The settlement was revised in 1901.

During British rule, the sole manufacture of the valley was cotton cloth, and trade was purely local, except for a small export of grain. The chief place in the valley was the village of Oghi, the headquarters of the Hazara border military police.

References

Mansehra District